E7, E07, E-7 or E7 may refer to:

Science and engineering
 E7 liquid crystal mixture
 E7, the Lie group in mathematics
 E7 polytope, in geometry
 E7 papillomavirus protein
 E7 European long distance path

Transport
 EMD E7, a diesel locomotive
 European route E07, an international road
 Peugeot E7, a hackney cab
 PRR E7, a steam locomotive
 Carbon Motors E7,a  police car
 E7 series, a Japanese high-speed train
 Nihonkai-Tōhoku Expressway and Akita Expressway (between Kawabe JCT and Kosaka JCT), route E7 in Japan
 Cheras–Kajang Expressway, route E7 in Malaysia

Other uses
 Boeing E-7, either:
 Boeing E-7 ARIA, the original designation assigned by the United States Air Force under the Mission Designation System to the EC-18B Advanced Range Instrumentation Aircraft.
 Boeing E-7 Wedgetail, the designation assigned by the Royal Australian Air Force to the Boeing 737 AEW&C (airborne early warning and control) aircraft.
 Economy 7, an electricity tariff
 E-7 enlisted rank in the military of the United States
 E7 (countries)
 E7, a musical note in the seventh octave
 E-7, the original designation for the EC-18 ARIA electronic warfare aircraft
 E7, a postcode district in the E postcode area for east London
 European Aviation Air Charter, by IATA airline designator
 Nokia E7, a smart phone
 Samsung Galaxy E7, a smart phone
 E07, a number station allegedly used by Russia, and nicknamed "The English Man"